Apiocephalus licheneus is a species of beetle in the family Cerambycidae. It was described by Gahan in 1906.

References

Lepturinae
Beetles described in 1906